Nocatee is an unincorporated community in DeSoto County, Florida, United States. It is located just south southwest of the city of Arcadia.

After the recount of votes on November 30, 2018, Republican Candidate Daniel Neads defeated the incumbent Timothy Farley as the new Mayor of Nocatee, Florida. Previous Mayor was Henry Crews. In December 2018 Timothy Farley was removed as Mayor following allegations of operating a dog fighting ring. He was replaced by Jose Ortiz-Cruz the first Mexican American to ever hold this office.

References

Unincorporated communities in DeSoto County, Florida
Unincorporated communities in Florida
Former census-designated places in Florida